A step and repeat banner (sometimes a step and repeat wall or press wall) is a publicity backdrop used primarily for event photography, printed with a repeating pattern such that brand logos or emblems are visible in photographs or selfies of the individuals standing in front of it. Step and repeat banners are common fixtures of red carpet or fashion events.

Another version of the press wall is often seen in sports, where the same type of background with sponsor or team logos is utilized as the background for a press conference.

References 

Collage
Composition in visual art
Promotion and marketing communications